Pycnochromis iomelas , also known as the half and half chromis, is a species of reef dwelling fish in the family Pomacentridae. It is occasionally seen for sale in the aquarium trade.

Description
Pycnochromis iomelas  is split in color, being solid black from the middle of the dorsal fin to the nose, and solid white from the middle of the dorsal fin to the end of the caudal fin.  It grows to a size of 8 cm in length.

Distribution
Pycnochromis iomelas is from the Pacific ocean.  It can be found on the Great Barrier Reef, and reefs around northern New Guinea, Samoa, and the Society Islands.

References

External links
 

iomelas
Fish described in 1906
Taxa named by David Starr Jordan